Filippo Negroli (ca. 1510–1579) was an armourer from Milan. He was renowned as being extremely skilled, and may be considered the most famous armourer of all time. Working together with his younger brothers Giovan Battista (ca. 1511–1591) and Francesco (ca. 1522–1600) in the Negroli family workshop headed by their father Gian Giacomo Negroli (ca. 1463–1543), Filippo was specialized in repoussé of armour, whereas his brother Francesco was renowned for his damascening skills. Filippo's pieces are considered especially remarkable because they were wrought in steel, rather than the more-easily worked iron that was the traditionally assumed medium.

He made parade armour for several esteemed clients, including Charles V, Holy Roman Emperor and Guidobaldo II della Rovere.

Examples of his work include:
 Burgonet of Charles V at La Real Armería, Madrid, Spain.
 Burgonet at the Metropolitan Museum of Art.
 Burgonet at the Wallace Collection.
 Burgonet "Alla Romana Antica" at Kunsthistorisches Museum.

References

 Famous Makers and European Centers of Arms and Armor Production. The Metropolitan Museum of Art.
 Fred Stern. Did Napoleon wear armor?, artnet.com - magazine.
 Alan R. Williams. The Steel of the Negroli. The Metropolitan Museum of Art.
 Stuart W. Pyhrr and Jose-A. Godoy (1988),Heroic Armor of the Italian Renaissance: Filippo Negroli and his Contemporaries. The Metropolitan Museum of Art.

Further reading
 (see index)

Armourers
1510 births
1579 deaths
Businesspeople from Milan
16th-century Italian businesspeople